Gump or Gumps may refer to:

Arts and entertainment
 Forrest Gump, an American romantic comedy-drama film based on a novel by Winston Groom
 The Gump, a fictional character from the Oz series of books
 The Gumps, a popular comic strip (1917-1959) by Sidney Smith
 The Gumps (radio) (1931-1937), a radio sitcom based on the comic strip
 "Gump" (song), song by "Weird Al" Yankovic about Forrest Gump	
 Gump, a 1991 album by Sons of Freedom
 Gump, an elf in Legend (1985 film)

Other uses
 Apache Gump, an open source continuous integration system
 Gump's, a luxury American home furnishings and décor retailer founded in 1861
 WGMP, a radio station licensed to Montgomery, Alabama, branded as "104.9 The Gump"
 Guiana United Muslim Party, a former political party in Guyana
 GUMPS, a widely used acronym used by airplane pilots as a check-list
 Gump (died 2014), the last known Christmas Island forest skink

People
 David Ariail (1910-2001), American college football player nicknamed "Gump"
 Guy Cantrell (1904–1961), American Major League Baseball pitcher nicknamed "Gump"
 Gump Worsley (1929–2007), National Hockey League goaltender, member of the Hockey Hall of Fame
 Carissa Gump (born 1983), American weightlifter
 Scott Gump (born 1965), American golfer
 Frederick Gump (c. 1897-?), 19-year-old kidnapped, sexually assaulted and beaten by Harry Kendall Thaw, the latter better known for fatally shooting Stanford White

See also
 Johannes Gumpp (born 1626), Austrian painter

Lists of people by nickname